This article describes the group stage of the 2014–15 LEN Champions League.

Format
12 teams were drawn into two groups of six teams, where they play each other twice. The top fthree teams will advance to the final six.

Group A

Group B

External links
Official website

2014–15 LEN Champions League